The Legend of Walks Far Woman is a 1982 American television film starring Raquel Welch and Bradford Dillman. It aired on NBC.

Plot
An Indian woman kills her husband after he is violent towards her. She is banished from her tribe.

Cast
Raquel Welch as Walks Far Woman
Bradford Dillman as Singer
George Clutesi as Old Grandfather
Nick Mancuso as Horses Ghost
Eloy Casados		
Frank Salsedo as Many Scalps
Hortensia Colorado as Red Hoop Woman
Nick Ramus as Left Hand Bull
Alex Kubik as Elk Hollering
Branscombe Richmond as Big Lake

Production
The film was announced in June 1979 and filming took place later that year. It was made by Raquel Welch's own production company. There were reportedly a number of clashes involving Raquel Welch and the director on set.

Welch admitted the role represented "a change of pace" for her.

Reception
The film aired in the UK in 1980. It was not screened in the US until 1982 because some NBC executives thought it was "a disaster". Brandon Tartikoff of NBC cut 25 minutes from the film before it aired.

The New York Times said "there is nothing dreadfully wrong with Miss Welch's performance... it's just that the entire story is boring."

It was the highest-rated TV movie of the year.

References

External links

Films about Native Americans
Films about domestic violence
Films scored by Paul Chihara
NBC network original films
1982 television films
1982 films
Films with screenplays by Evan Hunter